Alpha Epsilon Pi, commonly known as AEPi, is a college fraternity founded at New York University in 1913 by Charles C. Moskowitz and ten other men. The fraternity has more than 150 active chapters across the United States, Canada, United Kingdom, and Israel, and has initiated more than 110,000 members. Although the fraternity is based upon Jewish principles, it is non-discriminatory and is open to all who are willing to espouse its purpose and values.

History

Alpha Epsilon Pi was founded in 1913 under the Washington Square Arch at New York University (NYU) by Charles C. Moskowitz and 10 other Jewish men: David K. Schafer, Isador M. Glazer, Herman L. Kraus, Arthur E. Leopold, Benjamin M. Meyer, Arthur M. Lipkint, Charles J. Pintel, Maurice Plager, Hyman Shulman, and Emil J. Lustgarten. These men are known as the "Immortal 11." Their first pledge was Samuel L. Epstein.

Charles C. Moskowitz had just transferred to New York University's School of Commerce from the City College of New York. Several fraternities at the School of Commerce expressed interest in him and one gave him a bid. The name of that fraternity is unknown.  When Charles asked whether his close Jewish friends could join as well, he was told that the invitation was for him alone. At this point, the group of 11 men began meeting regularly in a German Ratskeller called "Haan's Ladies' and Gentlemen's Restaurant, Cafe and Rathskeller". Official school recognition of AEPi was granted on November 7.

The founding members intended for AEPi to be a national fraternity even before the second chapter at NYU was designated Alpha chapter. In 1917, the local fraternity Phi Tau at Cornell University became the Beta chapter of AEPi.

Only fifty-two men had been initiated into AEPi at the start of World War I. Almost every undergraduate and alumnus of the fraternity served in the military, causing the fraternity to become nearly inactive during the war years.

In the years between the world wars, Alpha Epsilon Pi grew to twenty-eight chapters. Expansion remained dormant throughout World War II as many fraternity members served in the war effort.

With the end of the war and the shift of the national headquarters to St. Louis, Alpha Epsilon Pi had gained new life and momentum in its reopening of inactive chapters, expansion to new campuses, and the merging with other locals that had seen reduced membership as a result of the war. In 1940, Sigma Omega Psi joined Alpha Epsilon Pi adding three chapters, as did Sigma Tau Phi in 1947.

The next two decades were a time of steady growth for Alpha Epsilon Pi, as well as other fraternities. However, with the onset of fighting in Vietnam in the early 1960s, fraternity life faltered. Liberal student bodies revolted against authority and the Greek system, which was seen as a conservative, elitist group. Membership plummeted and nearly half the chapter roll was lost. However, the fraternity was able to reverse the trend and stabilize membership numbers following the end of the Vietnam War.

In 2009, AEPi became the first fraternity to establish a chapter in Israel at the Interdisciplinary Center in Herzliya.

In 2014, AEPi was the first college student organization to be admitted as a full member to the Conference of Presidents of Major American Jewish Organizations.

In 2015, AEPi became the first fraternity to establish a chapter in Australia.

Coat of arms
To Brothers it is known as the "Cofa," arranged by the initials of the phrase. The coat of arms of Alpha Epsilon Pi contains a number of symbolic objects, the true meaning of which is only revealed to brothers during their initiation into the fraternity. Regardless, the coat of arms does contain symbols which have a history in Judaism obvious to the uninitiated and even to non-Jewish people. The crest of the arms contains a menorah intertwined with a star of David. Also, the top of the arms has a lion that could be the Lion of Judah.

Chapter organization
AEPi has specific titles that are used for its officers; many correspond to Fraternal tradition.
President — Master
Vice President — Lieutenant Master
Secretary — Scribe
Treasurer — Exchequer
Sergeant at Arms — Brother at Large
Master of Ceremonies — Sentinel
Head of Recruitment — Rush Chair
New Member Educator — Pledge Master

National controversies, local chapter or member misconduct

Reassertion of Jewish focus
Alpha Epsilon Pi's mission statement describing a "non-discriminatory fraternity" has occasionally come under fire, particularly under former Executive Director Andrew Borans:

 In 1990, Alpha Epsilon Pi's Mu Tau chapter at MIT decided to disband their chapter after the international fraternity kicked out 45 of 55 members of the chapter. Members believed it was largely in part due to the international fraternity's desire to use a member review process to re-align the chapter as a Jewish fraternity. Joseph P. Wong, former vice president of the chapter who was invited to stay, was quoted saying "AEPi is inherently discriminatory and does not deserve a place on this campus". Soon after, the national fraternity successfully rebuilt its Mu Tau chapter, with an emphasis on its Jewish heritage.  Meanwhile, the brothers who'd been removed went on to form a local chapter, which, five years later was admitted en masse to become the restored Epsilon Theta chapter of Sigma Nu on the campus, also successful.
 In 1998, members of UCLA's Xi Deuteron chapter dropped out, stating that the international organization was "discriminatory against non-Jewish pledges".
 In 2009, the Mu chapter at University of Virginia was shut down, with members claiming the international fraternity told them they "weren't Jewish enough".
 In 2015, the Beta Rho chapter at Brown University disaffiliated with Alpha Epsilon Pi, citing mistreatment of non-Jewish members by their international organization, and a lack of emphasis by the international organization on sexual assault education.

Local chapter or member misconduct
 In 2016, a freshman female student at the College of Charleston, site of ΑΕΠ's Chi Omicron chapter, sued the fraternity after she stated she was disrobed, served drugs and alcohol, and raped while one of the fraternity members recorded the assault on his cellphone during the fraternity's Bid Day celebration party. In her lawsuit, it states she had been seeking unspecified damages for her "serious personal injuries" that have required hospitalization, doctor's care and other treatment.  As a result of the lawsuit, two fraternity members, Timothy Eli Seppi and James F. West III, identified in the incident were arrested and released on bail and the fraternity charter was revoked.
 In 2019, the Upsilon Alpha chapter at the University of Arizona was kicked off campus for code-of-conduct violations including alcohol use, hazing and bodily harm to pledges.
 In 2019, the Epsilon chapter at Emory University was mandated to shut down for at least two years due to hazing pledges and alcohol violations.
 In 2020, several members left the Upsilon Kappa Alpha chapter at the University of St Andrews after more than twelve posts alleging rapes and sexual assaults were posted anonymously through social media, but in the absence of any formal complaint no member was expelled.

International organization structure
AEPi is governed by the Supreme Board of Governors.

The Alpha Epsilon Pi Foundation is the charitable arm of the organization. It directs the philanthropic affairs of the fraternity, supports projects of a Jewish and fraternal nature, and provides support for the individual chapters and colonies. They work very closely with the Director of Jewish Programming.

The Executive Office is made up of the professional staff that oversees the day-to-day functions of the fraternity. The current Chief Executive Officer is Rob Derdiger

The Supreme Board of Governors is made up of 11 positions: Supreme Master (President); Supreme Master-Elect (President-Elect/VP); Supreme Scribe (Secretary); Supreme Exchequer (Treasurer); Supreme Sentinel (Sergeant-at-Arms); five Supreme Governors at-large (other alumni members); and the Immediate Past Supreme Master

The Supreme Board of Governors makes the majority of decisions for the fraternity's well-being and meets semi-annually to discuss matters of importance, including the granting of charters.

Leadership input to the SBG from the undergraduate membership is accepted from The Undergraduate Cabinet, whose members are elected annually in the winter.

Notable alumni

Alpha Epsilon Pi has notable alumni across many different industries and fields. 
AEPi counts among its members at least 7 billionaires, including Facebook founder Mark Zuckerberg and Las Vegas Sands founder Sheldon Adelson. Alumni also include the founders of Tinder, Lyft, Home Depot and Hotels.com as well as former/current presidents or chairmen of Citigroup, ESPN, MGM Studios, Walt Disney Studios, 20th Century Fox and NBC Television. In sports, AEPi alumni include the founder and first owner of the Harlem Globetrotters, current owner of the Chicago Bulls and Chicago White Sox, the CEO of the Atlanta Hawks, president of the Florida Panthers, the commissioner of the National Hockey League and at least 2 Olympians. In American politics, AEPi has had at least 6 U.S. Representatives, 1 U.S. Senator, 1 U.S. Governor, a former Israeli Ambassador to the United States and a U.S. State Supreme Court Justice. In Canadian politics, AEPi alumni include the former Minister of Justice and Attorney General of Canada, the current and one former Israeli Ambassador to Canada,  as well as Canada's first Jewish Cabinet member and Deputy Prime Minister of Canada. In arts & entertainment, AEPi alumni include Pritzker Prize-winning architect Frank Gehry, Academy Award and Emmy Award-winner James L. Brooks, both members of Simon & Garfunkel, singer/rapper Hoodie Allen, actor Gene Wilder, as well as co-creator of American Dad! Matt Weitzman, and Family Guy writer Neil Goldman. The fraternity also counts 3 Nobel Prize-winners among its alumni.

List of chapters and alumni clubs

The fraternity currently has 154 active chapters and colonies in eleven of the fourteen Big Ten Conference schools, seven of eight Ivy League schools, and eight of the ten University of California campuses. It is also the largest international fraternity in Canada, California, New York, and Massachusetts. The fraternity established the Aleph chapter in Israel during the spring of 2009, located in the Interdisciplinary Center in Herzliya. It has since expanded to other universities in Israel. In 2011, the fraternity expanded to the United Kingdom, establishing a colony at St Andrews in the spring, followed by Birmingham and Leeds in the fall. 

The fraternity also has 24 active alumni clubs in several major cities.

See also
List of Jewish fraternities and sororities
List of social fraternities and sororities

References

External links
 Alpha Epsilon Pi International

 
Student organizations established in 1913
International student societies
North American Interfraternity Conference
Historically Jewish fraternities in the United States
Fraternities and sororities based in Indianapolis
1913 establishments in New York City
Jewish organizations established in 1913